Werenfried is a given name. Notable people with the name include:

 Werenfried of Elst (died c. 780), Benedictine monk, priest and missionary among the Frisians
 Werenfried van Straaten  (1913–2003), Dutch Catholic priest and social activist